The Jabotá River is a river of Mato Grosso state in western Brazil. The headwaters are the traditional home of the Ikpeng people.

See also
List of rivers of Mato Grosso

References
Brazilian Ministry of Transport

Rivers of Mato Grosso
Rivers of Xingu Indigenous Park